Prosper Bernard, S.J. (in) (May 25, 1902 – March 18, 1943) was a Canadian Jesuit priest who was executed by a Japanese officer in China in 1943.

Biography
In 1935, he became a Jesuit priest of the Roman Catholic Church. He left for China in January 1938, a week after Dr. Norman Bethune, the famous Canadian medical doctor. In China, he took the Chinese name of Nà Shì Róng. At that time, Japan was occupying part of China. On December 8, 1941, he was both director of the school of Taolou and that village's pastor when Canada, the United States, and Britain declared war on Japan following the attack on Pearl Harbor. These three Canadian priests continued to operate a school from inside that same church compound in Fengxian. On March 18, 1943, they were executed by a Japanese officer for trying to preserve the school. In 1990, the people of Fengxian erected a monument to their memory.

References

Father Bernard's nephew, Dr. Prosper Bernard, chairman of the board of trustees of the University Consortium of the Americas and Professor of Business at the Université du Québec in Montreal, has written the following books concerning Father Prosper Bernard:

External links
 Prosper Bernard, S.J.

1902 births
1943 deaths
20th-century Canadian Jesuits
Canadian Roman Catholic missionaries
Roman Catholic missionaries in China
Executed Roman Catholic priests
20th-century executions by Japan
Canadian people executed abroad
People executed by Japanese occupation forces
Canadian expatriates in China
Canadian civilians killed in World War II